Charletonia kalithensis is a species of mites belonging to the family Erythraeidae, first described from Greece.

References

Further reading
Hakimitabar, Masoud, et al. "Charletonia behshahriensis (Acari: Erythraeidae) from Iran with a key to species with two intercoxalae II and III." International Journal of Acarology 40.8 (2014): 595-604.
Šundić, Miloje, and I. Pajovic. "Redescription and new morphological data on Charletonia bucephalia larva (Acari: Erythraeidae) from specimens collected in Montenegro." Agriculture and Forestry 59 (2013): 163-171.

Trombidiformes
Arachnids of Europe